Joseph Johnston Holland (born December 11, 1964) is an American former nordic combined skier and ski jumper who competed in the late 1980s and early 1990s.

Biography
Holland's best finish at the Olympic Winter Games was eighth in the 3 x 10 km event at the 1992 Winter Olympics in Albertville, France. Holland also competed at the 1988 Winter Olympics in Calgary, Alberta, Canada.

A native of Norwich, Vermont, Holland was the leading U.S. Nordic combined skier in the late 1980s to early 1990s (4 time national champion). Holland's top world cup finish was 11th place twice (1991, 1992), and he was among the top 10 at the World Junior Championships in his last year as a junior.

Family life
Holland's brothers Mike Holland and Jim Holland also competed in the Olympic Winter Games.

References

External links
 
 
 
  

1964 births
American male Nordic combined skiers
Olympic Nordic combined skiers of the United States
Nordic combined skiers at the 1992 Winter Olympics
Nordic combined skiers at the 1988 Winter Olympics
Living people
People from Norwich, Vermont
Sportspeople from Vermont
University of Vermont alumni